A cassette single (CS), also known by the trademark cassingle, or capitalised as the trademark Cassette Single, is a music single supplied in the form of a Compact Cassette.  The cassette single was first introduced in 1980.

History

The debut single "C·30 C·60 C·90 Go" from Bow Wow Wow (catalogue number TCEMI 5088) was the first cassette single released worldwide, issued by EMI in the United Kingdom in 1980. In the United States of America, the first cassette single was released by A&M and I.R.S. Records in 1982 with the Go-Go's "Vacation", which contained two songs available on both sides of the tape.

Initially, the cassette single was supplied containing two or three versions of the primary single, sometimes also together with a B-side song. Typically, between 4 and 20 minutes of music were available on the early cassette singles, though later offerings would be available with five or six different versions of songs.

The British independent record label ZTT Records made good use of the cassette single format by 1984, with singles by Frankie Goes to Hollywood, Art of Noise and Propaganda being issued in unique versions on compact cassette.

American record companies began releasing cassette singles on a large scale in 1987, when vinyl record album sales were declining in favour of cassette recordings; the cassette single was meant to replace the 7-inch 45-rpm record in a similar way.

The cassette single format was used as a promotion in the 1990s, with Disney giving a 'cassingle' to attendees of Hercules promotional events.

Packaging

Originally, most cassette singles were released in a thick paper sleeve that slipped over the outside of the cassette.  This was then usually shrink wrapped in cellophane plastic.  Some singles contained one song on each side, much as 7-inch 45-rpm records had done, but others repeated the songs on both sides.  In some markets, cassette singles generally used the same packaging as standard cassettes, a rigid plastic box with a folded paper inlay insert.

As the cassette maxi single or extended play (EP) was released, more intricate packaging was incorporated that looked similar to the packaging of a regular album cassette.  These were placed in standard rigid plastic cassette cases, with a folded paper/cardstock inlay insert.  Unlike a full-length cassette album, these were generally only one two-sided inlay instead of an extended fold-out (the latter as required for song lyrics, and other additional information usually found on albums).  Maxi-singles usually contained four or more versions of a single song; i.e.: typically the '7-inch single', an 'album version', a shorter 'radio edit', and occasionally a 'club edit' or 'dance mix', and a '12-inch extended version'.  Other options could include an 'a cappella' version, and / or an 'instrumental' version.  Alternatively, some cassette singles contained differing versions of two different songs, as in a 'double A-side'.

Popularity
Although the cassette had reached a high level of popularity by the late 1970s, due to the ubiquity of mobile devices such as the Sony Walkman, the boombox, and car audio cassette players, cassette singles never rivalled gramophone records to even near the same extent as cassette albums had done. In the U.S., cassette singles were completely phased out by the mid 2000s.  One reason for their lesser popularity was because they appeared to be an inefficient use of the media to consumers; a cassette single took up the same storage space as a full album.  In April 2013, however, psychedelic rock band MGMT released the first single from their third album as a cassette single, and October 2014 saw the cassingle Great Big Happy Green Moonface from Polaris, the band's first release in fifteen years. In 2020 Lady Gaga released cassette singles for her songs "Stupid Love" and "Rain on Me" from the album Chromatica becoming her first single releases on the format.

References

Audio storage
Single types
Audiovisual introductions in 1980